National Soccer League is a defunct national association football league in Australia which was in operation from 1977 to 2004

National Soccer League may also refer to:

 National Soccer League, a central Canadian soccer league from 1926 to 1993, renamed the Canadian National Soccer League from 1994 to 1997
 National Soccer League (Chicago), 1928–present
 National Soccer League of New York, 1920s–1950s
 National Soccer League (indoor), a proposed indoor league in the U.S., 2004–2008
 National Soccer League (South Africa), 1985–1995
 Papua New Guinea National Soccer League, top-level football league of Papua New Guinea

See also
 NSL (disambiguation)
 National Indoor Soccer League
 New Zealand National Soccer League
 Women's National Soccer League, Australia